Slow Meadow is an American solo music project founded in Houston, Texas by Matt Kidd.  Slow Meadow creates atmospheric ambient chamber music.

History 
Matt Kidd began creating post-rock and ambient soundscapes in 2012, ultimately releasing 2 albums under the name Aural Method.  After taking a break from releasing music of his own for two years, Kidd befriended Marc Byrd of Hammock, and, with his encouragement, began creating more ambient music under his new moniker, Slow Meadow.  Slow Meadow was signed to Hammock's own label, Hammock Music, who in turn released Slow Meadow's self-titled debut album in August 2015.

Slow Meadow performed live at The Gatherings Concert Series, presented by Star's End, in April 2016. Slow Meadow also performed a live concert for the Echoes syndicated radio program in August 2016.

Discography

Albums 
 Slow Meadow (2015, Hammock Music) 
 Costero (2017, Hammock Music) 
Happy Occident (2019, Hammock Music)
Upstream Dream (2021, Hammock Music)

Singles 
 "Evoke", a musical score for the dance film "Evoke" (April 15, 2016 - Hammock Music) 
 "Hananel's Recovery," an excerpt from the short documentary "Vitals" by Director Jake Oleson (April 29, 2016 - Hammock Music) 
 "Blue Aubade" feat. Hotel Neon (March 16, 2016 - Hammock Music) 
 "Lachrymosia / Some Familiar..." (May 20, 2016 - Hammock Music) 
 "A Magnificent Gray / Memoria" (August 5, 2016 - Hammock Music)
 "Absence / Blue Aubade (Slow Meadow Version)" (October 14, 2016 - Hammock Music) >
 "Palemote / Ghosts in the Brazos" (November 18, 2016 - Hammock Music) 
 "Armoire Nocturne" (March 29, 2017 - Hammock Music)  
 "The Tragedy of the Commons / Semolina" ( August 11, 2017 - Hammock Music)
 "We're Losing the Moon / Cauda Luna" (March 16, 2018 - Hammock Music)
 "Those Who Rush Across the Sea / You Felt Like Home" (May 11, 2018 - Hammock Music)
 "Clouds, Not Clocks / Rara Pluma" (June 22, 2018 - Hammock Music)
 "Screensaver Prelude / Oh, the Myths We Need" (November 9, 2018 - Hammock Music)

See also
 List of ambient artists

References

External links 
 Official Website
 Aural Method

American ambient music groups
Musical groups from Houston